Mary Kirtley Waters (born 1958) is the Director of the United Nations Information Centre in Washington, D.C.

She served as Assistant Secretary of State for Legislative Affairs from 2017 to 2018.

Waters was a cabinet confirmation team leader for the presidential transition of Donald Trump. She has served as president of the North American Millers' Association, vice president for corporate relations with the Federal Agricultural Mortgage Corporation, and assistant secretary for congressional relations at the United States Department of Agriculture. She spent 15 years as senior director and legislative counsel at ConAgra.

References

External links
 Mary Kirtley Waters, U.S. Department of State
 Mary Kirtley Waters, United Nations

1958 births
Living people
University of Illinois Urbana-Champaign alumni
Antonin Scalia Law School alumni
21st-century American lawyers
Trump administration personnel
United States Assistant Secretaries of State